Digitus III or third digit can refer to:
 Middle finger (digitus III manus)
 Third toe (digitus III pedis)